Dame Quentin Alice Louise Bryce,  (née Strachan; born 23 December 1942) is an Australian academic who served as the 25th governor-general of Australia from 2008 to 2014. She is the first woman to have held the position, and was previously the 24th Governor of Queensland from 2003 to 2008.

Born in Brisbane, Queensland, Bryce was raised in Ilfracombe, with her family subsequently living in a number of country towns around Australia. She attended the University of Queensland, where she completed a Bachelor of Arts and a Bachelor of Laws, becoming one of the first women accepted to the Queensland Bar.

In 1968, Bryce became the first woman appointed as a faculty member of the law school where she had studied, and in 1978 she joined the new National Women's Advisory Council (later National Women's Consultative Council and then Australian Council for Women). This was followed by appointment to a number of positions, including the first Director of the Queensland Women's Information Service, the Queensland Director of the Human Rights and Equal Opportunity Commission, and the Federal Sex Discrimination Commissioner in 1988. Her services to the community saw her appointed an Officer of the Order of Australia in 1988, and a Companion of the Order of Australia and Dame of the Order of St John of Jerusalem in 2003. In 2011, Elizabeth II invested Bryce as a Commander of the Royal Victorian Order at Government House.

Bryce was appointed Governor of Queensland in 2003. Although concerns were raised by some over her time in the office, her five-year term was going to be extended until 2009. However, on 13 April 2008, it was announced by Prime Minister Kevin Rudd that Bryce was to become the next Governor-General of Australia. The decision was generally well-received and on 5 September 2008 Bryce was sworn in, succeeding Major General Michael Jeffery and becoming the first woman to hold the office. Bryce's tenure was not without criticism. In an unprecedented move for an incumbent governor-general, Bryce made public comments in November 2013 widely interpreted as supporting an Australian republic and same-sex marriage. She was succeeded by General Sir Peter Cosgrove as governor-general on 28 March 2014.

Early life and education

Quentin Alice Louise Strachan was born in 1942 in Brisbane, the second of four daughters. Her parents, Norman Walter Strachan and Edwina Naida Wetzel, had taken up residence at Ilfracombe in 1940. Bryce—along with all of the children in her family—received home-schooling rather than attending the local State school. Her family left the area in 1949, initially relocating to Launceston, Tasmania, where they remained for approximately a year. Returning to Queensland, her family moved to Belmont. While living in Belmont she attended the Camp Hill State School, and there first met her future husband, Michael Bryce. She was a member of Girl Guides Australia as a Brownie.

During the period that they were residing in Belmont, her father moved to Tenterfield, New South Wales. In 1956, Quentin Strachan started attending boarding school at Moreton Bay College, Wynnum, Brisbane.

Upon graduating from high school, Quentin Strachan undertook studies at the University of Queensland, initially enrolling in a social work and arts degree, but transferring to law in her third year at the institution. She graduated from the university with a Bachelor of Arts in 1962 and a Bachelor of Laws in 1965. That year she became one of the first women to be admitted to the Queensland Bar, although she never practised professionally.

Quentin Strachan married Michael Bryce on 12 December 1964; the couple have two daughters and three sons. Michael Bryce died on 15 January 2021, aged 82 years.

Career

After spending some time in London, Bryce returned to Australia and accepted a part-time tutoring position at the T. C. Beirne School of Law at the University of Queensland in 1968, thus becoming the first woman to be appointed to the faculty. In 1969 she took up a lecturing position at the law school, and she continued to teach at the university until 1983.

In 1978 the Fraser government formed the National Women's Advisory Council and Bryce was "vaulted to prominence" with her appointment to the council, taking on the role of convener in 1982. In 1984 she became the first director of the Queensland Women's Information Service under the umbrella of the Office of the Status of Women and was appointed as the "women's representative on the National Committee on Discrimination in Employment and Occupation". In 1987 she became the Queensland director of the Human Rights and Equal Opportunity Commission (HREOC).

Over a five-year period (1988–1993) Bryce served as Federal Sex Discrimination Commissioner during the time of the Hawke Labor government. Her time in the role was a busy one, with around 2,000 complaints being handled by the commission each year and the work difficult and complex. The period was also noted as being one of "galloping legal reform" for the rights of women, yet, as Sandra McLean described it, Bryce kept a firm grip on the "reins of change" during this time. Nevertheless, concerns were raised when, in 1990, Alexander Proudfoot formally complained that the women's health centres in the Australian Capital Territory were operating in breach of the Sex Discrimination Act. This culminated in 1994 when Bryce faced an HREOC hearing after being accused of discriminating against Proudfoot – and ended when the commission found in Bryce's favour and dismissed the complaint, stating that the behaviour in question "did not reflect on the way Ms Bryce discharged her duties".

After finishing her time as the Sex Discrimination Commissioner, Bryce became the founding chair and chief executive officer of the National Childcare Accreditation Council, where she remained for three years before changing direction between 1997 and 2003 when she became the principal and chief executive officer of The Women's College within the University of Sydney, New South Wales. The move was said to have "stunned her political and legal acquaintances", but Bryce saw it as bringing "together all the life skills and attributes" that she had acquired, as well as providing an opportunity to have an influence on the students' futures.

In other roles, Bryce has been the chair of the National Breast Cancer Advisory Council and sat on the Australian Women's Cricket Board, and has been a member of organisations such as the YWCA, the Australian Children's Television Foundation and the Association for the Welfare of Children in Hospital. Bryce was also a US State Department Visitor in 1978 and a Member of the Australian Delegation to the UN Human Rights Commission in Geneva, Switzerland from 1989 to 1991.

Governor of Queensland

In 2003, on the recommendation of the Premier of Queensland, Peter Beattie, Elizabeth II, Queen of Australia, appointed Bryce as Governor of Queensland, the second woman to occupy the position. Once Bryce's nomination had been accepted by the Queen, Beattie opened it up for debate in the Legislative Assembly—an "unprecedented" move performed by the Premier as the first step in changing the manner by which the nominations are managed. Nevertheless, the outcome was never in doubt, as Beattie had a majority in the Legislative Assembly and had "cleared the vote with the National and Liberal leaders" prior to the debate.

Bryce's time at Government House, Brisbane, was not always peaceful, but she was considered by some as a "highly respected figure" during her time as governor. Concerns raised in the media included the "substantial" exit of staff at Government House not long after Bryce became governor, as at least eight staff, including the executive office, head chef, house manager and gardener resigned or were fired during her term, and the use of Government House for private parties. In response to the latter, Beattie argued that there was nothing wrong with holding private functions at Government House, especially as Bryce had paid for the events out of her own pocket, while the Queensland Public Sector Union stated in 2008 that the staff disputes were "with the management as a whole, but there wasn't anything specific against the Governor". Staff at Queensland Government House had "not [been] enthusiastic" about Bryce as Queensland governor. A former staff member described Bryce as a "control freak". During this time, Bryce was the Patron of Girl Guides Queensland.

In January 2008, it was announced her initial five-year term, due to end in late July, was to be extended to cover the period of Queensland's sesquicentennial celebrations in 2009. In making the announcement, Labor Premier Anna Bligh described how Bryce had been an "inspiring leader" while serving as governor, and acknowledged Bryce's willingness to spend a "great deal of time" in regional and remote areas, serving as a "Governor for all of Queensland". The extension did not eventuate, however, as she was appointed governor-general, and she was succeeded as Queensland governor on 29 July 2008 by Penelope Wensley.

Governor-General of Australia

On 13 April 2008 it was announced that, on the recommendation of the Labor Prime Minister, Kevin Rudd, Queen Elizabeth II had approved Bryce's appointment as the next Governor-General of Australia. The decision was generally well received: current and previous Labor state premiers supported her selection and both the then Leader of the Opposition, Brendan Nelson, and the leader of the Australian Greens, Bob Brown, spoke in favour of the decision. Patricia Edgar described Bryce's selection as an "inspired choice", while Jill Singer in the Herald Sun said that the decision signalled "an important about face for Australia".

There was some opposition to the appointment, in particular from columnist Des Houghton, who argued that she would bring a "fair bit of baggage" to the role (in reference to the controversies surrounding her time as the Governor of Queensland) and that she had failed to live up to her promise to be outspoken during her time at Government House. Concerns were also raised in August 2008, when it was revealed that Bryce intended to replace Malcolm Hazell, who had been the Official Secretary for both Major General Michael Jeffery and Peter Hollingworth, with Stephen Brady. Rudd defended Bryce's decision, arguing that she had the right to appoint a new Official Secretary.

Bryce was sworn in on 5 September 2008. An extension of her term was announced on 24 October 2012, to expire in March 2014. During this time, she served as the Patron of Girl Guides Australia.

On the election of Bill Shorten as Leader of the Labor Party and Leader of the Opposition in October 2013, Bryce offered her resignation to Prime Minister Tony Abbott, in order to forestall any perception of bias, given that Bryce's daughter Chloe is married to Shorten. While acknowledging her magnanimity, Abbott declined to accept her resignation and asked her to serve the rest of her term. According to him Bryce provided continuity at a time of political turbulence and she should be commended for her dedication to public service.

Controversy
Greg Sheridan, in the national newspaper The Australian, suggested that the governor-general risked "politicising and misusing the office". Sheridan was commenting on Bryce's planned trip to Africa on behalf of the prime minister to lobby for a seat for Australia in the United Nations Security Council. He further stated that Bryce's "feigned interest in Africa will be seen cynically by Africans". Sheridan added that governors-general should travel overseas "only rarely and for ceremonial purposes", and "they have no right to engage in foreign policy debate, at home or abroad".

Similarly to her time as governor in Queensland, Government House in Canberra witnessed significant staff turnover, with claims that she was very difficult to work for.

In November 2013, Bryce delivered the annual ABC Boyer Lecture. Bryce stated she would like to see an Australia where "people are free to love and marry whom they choose [...] And where perhaps, my friends, one day, one young girl or boy may even grow up to be our nation's first head of state". Her comments drew severe criticism, not merely for their support of a republic while still serving as the Queen's representative, but because the role is meant to be strictly non-partisan. Senator Dean Smith called them "a slap in the face to many, many Australians, and a significant breach of trust". Amanda Vanstone accused her of possible grandstanding, and wrote: "In publicly declaring these views, she has brought that high office into a political realm in which it does not belong ... Someone might explain to her that the job is not about her ... it's about us." Then-Prime Minister Tony Abbott supported Bryce's right to comment, saying "It's more than appropriate for the Governor-General, approaching the end of her term, to express a personal view on a number of subjects, and that's what she was doing."

Honours

Honorary military positions
 2008–2014: Colonel-in-Chief of the Royal Australian Army Medical Corps

Honorary degrees

Queensland:
Bryce was conferred with the degree of Honorary Doctor of the University (Hon.DUniv) by Griffith University in 2003.
Honorary Doctor of James Cook University (Hon.DUniv (JCU))
In 2004, Bryce was made an Honorary Doctor of the University (Hon.DU) by the Queensland University of Technology.
In 2006 Bryce was awarded an Honorary Doctorate of Laws (Hon.LLD) by the University of Queensland.
In 2016, Bryce was a recipient of the Queensland Greats Awards.
New South Wales:
In 1998, she was awarded an Honorary Doctorate of Laws by Macquarie University (Hon.LLD).
In 2002, she was awarded an Honorary Doctorate of Letters by Charles Sturt University (Hon.DLitt).
In 2010, Bryce was awarded an Honorary Doctorate of Laws (Hon.LLD) by the University of Sydney, where she was the principal of The Women's College, University of Sydney from 1997 to 2003.
In 2012, Bryce was awarded an Honorary Doctorate of Letters (Hon.DLitt) by the University of Western Sydney.
Bryce is a Life Fellow of the Australian Academy of Law. She was appointed an Honorary Fellow of the Academy of the Social Sciences in Australia in 2010.

Footnotes

References

 
 
 
 
 
 
 
 
 
 
  
 
 "Quentin Bryce and Amanda Bell: champions of women’s leadership and of mentoring" in Donald Markwell, "Instincts to Lead": On Leadership, Peace, and Education, Connor Court: Australia, 2013.  https://web.archive.org/web/20170222013842/http://www.connorcourt.com/catalog1/index.php?main_page=product_info&products_id=256

External links 
 ABC Radio National Boyer Lectures, 2013 Boyer Lectures
 

|-

1942 births
Australian Commanders of the Royal Victorian Order
Australian women lawyers
Australian people of Scottish descent
Australian republicans
Dames of the Order of Australia
Dames of Grace of the Order of St John
Governors-General of Australia
Governors of Queensland
Fellows of the Australian Academy of Law
Living people
People from Brisbane
Recipients of the Australian Sports Medal
Recipients of the Centenary Medal
University of Queensland alumni
Academic staff of the University of Queensland
Queensland Greats
Scouting and Guiding in Australia
Girl Guiding and Girl Scouting
20th-century Australian lawyers
Female governors-general